Georges Pouilley (23 July 1893 – 12 January 1958) was a French freestyle swimmer. He competed at the 1920 Summer Olympics in the 100 m and 4 × 200 m, but failed to reach the finals. He later became an aviator.

References

1893 births
1958 deaths
French male freestyle swimmers
Swimmers at the 1920 Summer Olympics
Olympic swimmers of France